The Berliner Lokal-Anzeiger was a daily newspaper published in Berlin, with one of the highest national circulations of its time. Its publisher was newspaper magnate August Scherl, who also owned Die Woche, an illustrated weekly.

References

1883 establishments in Germany
1945 disestablishments in Germany
Defunct newspapers published in Germany
German-language newspapers
Publications established in 1883
Publications disestablished in 1945
Weekly newspapers published in Germany